The Freebie is a 2010 American independent film directed by Katie Aselton that had its world premiere at the Sundance Film Festival. The plot centers on a married couple who, frustrated by the lack of sex in their relationship, allow each other a one-night stand. The film is largely improvised.

Plot 
Darren and Annie have a comfortable relationship built on love, trust and communication, enjoying each other's company and still laughing at each other's jokes. However, their sex life has become dormant. When a dinner party conversation with friends leads to an honest discussion about the state of their love life, they begin to flirt with an idea for a way to spice their marriage up. They each agree to  one night of freedom, no strings attached, no questions asked.

Cast
 Dax Shepard as Darren
 Katie Aselton as Annie
 Frankie Shaw as Coffee girl
 Ross Partridge as Bartender
 Sean Nelson as John
 Bellamy Young as Jessica
 Joshua Leonard as Dinner Party Guest
 Marguerite Phillips as Emily
 Ken Kennedy as Ken
 Scott Pitts as Scott
 Lenora Pitts as Lea

Production
The script had originated as a detailed 6-page outline, with the rest of the dialogue being improvised. For some scenes, Aselton would let the camera roll for as long as 30 minutes, and then would choose which dialogue made it into the final cut. Dax Shepard signed on to play Darren after another actor exited the project.

Release
The film had its world premiere at the 2010 Sundance Film Festival in the inaugural NEXT section. It was acquired by Phase 4 Films and went on to screen at SXSW. It was given a limited theatrical release on September 17, 2010.

Reception 
The Freebie holds a 55% approval rating on review aggregator website Rotten Tomatoes, with an average rating of 5.6/10 from 29 critics. On Metacritic, the film holds a rating of 54 out of 100, based on eight critics, indicating "mixed or average reviews".

Todd McCarthy of Variety gave the film a positive review, writing: "From a performance P.O.V., Aselton and Shepard hold the screen well and are most watchable, and Aselton does a fluid directing job within the limited challenge she set for herself production-wise. Benjamin Kasulke’s HD lensing is bright and sharp, while Nat Sanders’ editing is very crisp." 

Andrew Schenker of Slant gave the film a negative review and a 1.5/10 rating, writing: "Never are Aselton's failings more evident than in a pair of dinner party scenes, one of which opens the film, and which involve the central couple and their friends in a discussion of the nature of romance."

References

External links
 
 

2010 films
2010 comedy films
2010 comedy-drama films
2010 directorial debut films
2010 independent films
American comedy films
American independent films
American sex comedy films
2010s sex comedy films
Mumblecore films
2010s English-language films
Films directed by Katie Aselton
2010s American films